Headz is a series of compilation albums released by the Mo' Wax record label. The first installment, titled Headz, was released on 31 October 1994, and reissued on 20 May 1996. It was followed on 28 October 1996 by Headz 2A and Headz 2B.

Facts 2015 list of the best trip hop albums of all time included the first Headz album at number 30, and Headz 2A and Headz 2B jointly at number seven.

Headz

Track listing

Charts

Headz 2A

Track listing

Charts

Headz 2B

Track listing

Charts

References

External links
 
 
 

Compilation album series
Record label compilation albums
Mo' Wax compilation albums
1994 compilation albums
1996 compilation albums